The Heart Watches While the Brain Burns is American singer-songwriter Mike Doughty's ninth studio album and 19th overall, released on October 14, 2016. It was produced by DJ Good Goose. The album's title is a reference to an anecdote told in an episode of the podcast WTF with Marc Maron. Much of the album's content was inspired by Doughty's relocation from New York City to Memphis, Tennessee. The song "I Can't Believe I Found You in That Town" was released as a digital single ahead of the album's release.

Track listing

References

Mike Doughty albums
2016 albums